"L'Oiseau et l'Enfant" ("The Bird and the Child") was the winning song in the Eurovision Song Contest 1977 performed in French by Marie Myriam, who represented . The song was composed by Jean-Paul Cara and written by Joe Gracy. This is currently the last song to have won for France.

The song was the eighteenth and final song performed on the night, following 's Dream Express with "A Million in One, Two, Three". At the close of voting, it had received 136 points, coming first in a field of eighteen. Myriam recorded the song in five languages; French, English (as "The Bird and the Child"), German ("Der Vogel und das Mädchen"), Spanish ("El zagal y el ave azul") and her mother tongue Portuguese ("A ave e a infância").

During Preview Week, Myriam's music video showed her performing the song in an open-air atmosphere, in a section of the Square René Viviani in Paris. This preview video is notable for the prominent presence of the gendarmes having to restrain the crowd, some of whom having climbed the noted "oldest tree in Paris" to catch a glimpse of the singer. On the contest night, she performed in a floor-length orange gown while her five backup singers were clad in black.

It was succeeded as French representative at the 1978 contest by Joël Prévost with "Il y aura toujours des violons".

Covers
In 2016, the UNICEF project Kids United covered the song in their second album Tout le bonheur du monde. The song also appeared on SNEP singles charts in August 2016.
A cover of the song was used in an advertisement for IKEA in Canada in 2021.

Charts performance

Sources
 Official Eurovision Song Contest site, history by year, 1977
 Detailed info & lyrics, The Diggiloo Thrush, "L'oiseau et l'enfant".

References

Eurovision songs of France
Eurovision songs of 1977
French-language songs
Eurovision Song Contest winning songs
Polydor Records singles
1977 songs
Kids United songs